Square Enix Europe is a British video game publishing arm of Square Enix, a Japanese video game company. Square Enix acquired British publisher Eidos Interactive on 22 April 2009, which was then merged with Square Enix's European publishing wing and Square Enix London Studios and reorganized as Square Enix Europe. This list includes retail, downloadable, and mobile games primarily produced by Square Enix Europe's part of the group since its formation in April 2009. Prior to its purchase, Eidos plc (previously named SCi Entertainment) was the holding company for the Eidos group of companies, including publisher Eidos Interactive and development studios such as Crystal Dynamics, IO Interactive, Beautiful Game Studios, and Eidos Montréal.

In 2014, Square Enix Europe founded indie game publishing division Square Enix Collective, and in 2018 the former Square Enix London Studios division, which handles publishing of games from third party developers, was renamed Square Enix External Studios. Development studio IO Interactive was sold in 2017, and in 2022, Square Enix sold Western studios and several IPs of Square Enix Europe, including Crystal Dynamics, Eidos Montréal, and Square Enix Montréal, to Embracer Group. It retained the rights to the Outriders, Life Is Strange and Just Cause franchises, developed in collaboration with third party studios.

Studios under Square Enix Europe have developed titles belonging to franchises previously published by Eidos, such as Tomb Raider, Hitman, Deus Ex, and Championship Manager. The Championship Manager series has seen the greatest number of releases, at nine games on four platforms, followed by the Tomb Raider series at six games across eleven platforms. Several of these franchises have sold millions of copies both before and after its founding: the Tomb Raider franchise has the highest lifetime sales with over 88 million copies since 1996, followed by Hitman with over 15 million copies sold since 2000. Several other series, including Deus Ex, Championship Manager, and Just Cause, have also sold several million copies over their lifetimes.

Video games

Cancelled games

Notes

References 

 Europe
Square Enix Europe